La Farge Retainer Houses, also known as Biddlecom House and Budlong House, are two historic homes located at Orleans, Jefferson County, New York. They were built about 1835.  The Biddlecom House is a 2-story, front-gabled limestone building with a side hall entry and -story rear wing.  Also on the property is a small frame garage, decorative cast iron fence, stone wall, and stone carriage step.  The Budlong House is a 2-story, front-gabled limestone building with a -story rear wing.  They were built by land speculator and French merchant, John La Farge, as "model homes" to attract new settlers to the region.

It was listed on the National Register of Historic Places in 1997.

References

Houses on the National Register of Historic Places in New York (state)
Federal architecture in New York (state)
Houses completed in 1835
Houses in Jefferson County, New York
National Register of Historic Places in Jefferson County, New York